Kullimaa may refer to several places in Estonia:

Kullimaa, Pärnu County, village in Vändra Parish, Pärnu County
Kullimaa, Rapla County, village in Käru Parish, Rapla County